HD 139139 (also known as EPIC 249706694) is likely part of a bound pair system of main sequence stars about  away from Earth in the constellation Libra. HD 139139 is a G-type main-sequence star, a little larger and more luminous than the Sun, and at an almost identical temperature. It has an apparent magnitude of 9.8. Both stars have a similar proper motion, meaning they may form a gravitationally-bound binary pair. 

HD 139139 exhibits dips in brightness similar to those caused by transiting Earth-like planets. The Kepler space telescope observed 28 dips in their brightness over an 87-day period (23 August – 20 November 2017). The dips do not appear to be periodic as would be expected if they were due to transiting planets.

It is unknown which of the two stars produces the dimming events. Potential explanations that have been investigated include planets transiting a binary star, planets that are perturbing the orbits of each other producing large transit timing variations, a disintegrating planet, large dust producing asteroids, and short lived sunspots. According to Andrew Vanderburg, one of the researchers of the original studies, "In astronomy we have a long history of not understanding something, thinking it’s aliens, and later finding out it’s something else ... The odds are pretty good that it’s going to be another one of those."

Background
HD 139139 was identified as unusual by two independent groups of visual surveyors (citizen scientists) working in collaboration with veteran astronomers. "But some of these patterns are too complex for computers to tease out; volunteer citizen scientists also comb through the Kepler catalogue, using the human brain's power to uncover surprising signals. In the spring of 2018 some of these layperson astronomers contacted Vanderburg and told him to check out HD 139139, a sunlike star roughly 350 light-years away."

HD 139139 is one of the 0.5% of stars in the sky that can see Earth transit, according to Andrew Vanderburg. "The transit impact parameter would be close to 0.9, so they can just barely see us -- the transit duration would be only about 40% the duration we'd expect for a perfectly edge-on transit."

See also
 Tabby's Star
 List of stars that have unusual dimming periods

References

External links
 EPIC Catalog at MAST
 
 
 Video (1:00): HD 139139 summary/kgw
 Why the “Random Transiter” is now the most mysterious star in the Galaxy June 29, 2019

 

Binary stars
G-type main-sequence stars
139139
Libra (constellation)
J15370623-1908329
BD-18 4107
Unsolved problems in astronomy